Akkurthi is a village in Srikalahasti mandal, located in Tirupati district of Indian state of Andhra Pradesh.

References

Villages in Tirupati district